William Charles Higgins (26 February 1924 — 1981) was an English footballer who played as a winger.

Career
In 1946, Everton signed Higgins from Tranmere Rovers, with whom he played for on amateur terms. Higgins made his debut for Everton on 21 September 1946 in a 0–0 Merseyside derby draw against Liverpool. Over the course of four seasons, Higgins made 48 league appearances, scoring eight times.

In May 1950, Higgins signed for Colombian club Millonarios, during the El Dorado era of Colombian football, in which a breakaway league was formed. Despite receiving a £1,000 signing-on fee and a monthly wage of £120, Higgins' time in Colombia was short lived. The Liverpool Echo reported Higgins was unhappy in Colombia and in financial despair, with his signing-on fee "not in order". Higgins returned to England five months later, with £19 to his name. As a result of leaving Everton to join Colombia's Campeonato Profesional, Higgins was suspended by The Football Association, before having his suspension later lifted. Despite talks with Luton Town and Sheffield Wednesday, Higgins eventually ended up signing for Welsh club Bangor City, who played in the English non-league system.

Higgins made his debut for Bangor on 2 December 1950, scoring in a 2–1 win against Runcorn. In October 1952, Higgins had a transfer request accepted by the club. Despite this, he remained with Bangor until the end of the 1952–53 season.

References

1924 births
1981 deaths
Association football wingers
English footballers
English expatriate footballers
Sportspeople from Birkenhead
Tranmere Rovers F.C. players
Everton F.C. players
Millonarios F.C. players
Bangor City F.C. players
Categoría Primera A players
Expatriate footballers in Colombia
English expatriate sportspeople in Colombia
English Football League players